Secure FTP is a Java-based FTP client developed by Glub Tech. Some of its features include: FTPS (FTP over SSL/TLS), bookmarks, compression, proxy and firewall support, multiple connections, chmod, drag-and-drop, command-line scripting, and localization for 8 languages, including English, French, German, Spanish, Japanese, Portuguese, Brazilian Portuguese and Russian. It can be used via its GUI or CLI.

History 
In 1999, Secure FTP started as a senior project at UCSD by classmates Gary Cohen and Brian Knight. The intent of the project was to address the inherent security flaws in FTP. Up to this point, there were no easy solutions to secure a user's credentials during login to an FTP server. The outcome of this project led to the first known implementation of FTPS (FTP over SSL/TLS).

On July 26, 2013, the project was open-sourced and moved permanently to GitHub.

Licensing 
Secure FTP is free for all use under an Apache 2 license.

See also
Comparison of FTP client software

References

External links
Download page

FTP clients